Mwema Ndungo is a young writer from the Democratic Republic of the Congo (DRC). He was born in the eastern region of the country and spent his childhood in Goma. He is a third child of a Congolese Christian family and has attended the Universite de Goma (Faculté de Médecine) before moving to Nairobi, Kenya, to study communication at Daystar University.

Mwema has become a mentor to a large number of youths in Kenya, DRC, Uganda, and Rwanda. His first book, Healing the Wounds has earned him the reputation of being a most outspoken young writer against negative ethnicity. He has also written Insight on the Trap: Where there is abuse of Weakness (2008).

References

External links
Mwema Ndungo's website

Democratic Republic of the Congo non-fiction writers
Living people
Year of birth missing (living people)